The 2022 Colorado gubernatorial election was held on November 8, 2022.  Incumbent Democratic Governor Jared Polis won re-election to a second term, defeating Republican University of Colorado regent Heidi Ganahl. The primary election was held on June 28.

Polis's 2022 victory marked the first time in American history that an openly gay politician was re-elected governor of a state. Polis had the best performance for a re-elected Colorado governor since Bill Owens in 2002, the best for a Democrat since Roy Romer in 1990, and the highest raw vote total ever in a Colorado gubernatorial race.

Democratic convention

Candidates

Nominated at convention
 Jared Polis, incumbent governor
Running mate: Dianne Primavera, incumbent lieutenant governor

Eliminated at convention
 Dustin Rorex

Results

Republican primary

Candidates

Nominee
 Heidi Ganahl, member of the Regents of the University of Colorado
 Running mate: Danny Moore, businessman

Eliminated in primary
 Greg Lopez, former Mayor of Parker and former Director of the Small Business Administration for Colorado; candidate for governor in 2018 and for U.S. Senate in 2016

Eliminated at convention
 Laurie Clark 
 Darryl Gibbs, truck driver and U.S. Air Force veteran
 Jon Gray-Ginsberg
 Danielle Neuschwanger, realtor
 Jim Rundberg, U.S. Army veteran, independent candidate for governor in 2014, and Republican candidate for President of the United States in 2016

Declined
Guy Benson, political pundit, Fox News contributor, and political editor for Townhall
Bill Owens, former Governor of Colorado (endorsed Ganahl)

Endorsements

Results

American Constitution convention

Candidates

Nominee
Danielle Neuschwanger, realtor (previously ran for Republican nomination)
Running mate: Darryl Gibbs, truck driver and U.S. Air Force veteran (previously ran for Republican nomination)

General election

Predictions

Endorsements

Polling
Aggregate polls

Graphical summary

Jared Polis vs. Greg Lopez

Jared Polis vs. Danielle Neuschwanger

Jared Polis vs. generic Republican

Debates

Results

By Congressional District
Polis won 6 out of 8. congressional districts, including one that elected a Republican representative.

Analysis 
Incumbent governor Jared Polis easily won re-election by 19.3%, a margin much larger than aggregate polling predicted. Polis piled up massive margins in the heavily populous North Central Colorado Urban Area, which contains the state capital Denver plus its surrounding suburbs Aurora, Thornton, Lakewood, and Broomfield; in addition to other major cities Boulder and Fort Collins, home to the University of Colorado and Colorado State University respectively. Outside the Denver-Boulder-Fort Collins region, Polis also won a long row of counties along the Rocky Mountains from Routt in the north to La Plata in the south, which contains a number of liberal leaning ski resort towns like Telluride, Aspen, and Steamboat Springs. In Southern Colorado, a region historically known for coal mining, and home to a sizable Hispanic population, Polis managed to halt the Democratic backsliding that had been taking place here since the mid-2010s in both state and federal races. Polis's definitive victory likely helped other Democrats down the ballot to win their races or win them by comfortable margins, allowing Democrats to keep control of the state government.

Heidi Ganahl did best in the traditionally rural areas of Colorado bordering Kansas in the east, Utah in the west, and several larger counties including Weld (Greeley), Douglas (Castle Rock and Highlands Ranch), and El Paso (Colorado Springs). In the latter two counties, Ganahl significantly underperformed previous Republican nominees in these traditionally conservative urban counties, winning Douglas by 0.38% and El Paso by 3.97%, the closest either county had come to voting Democratic since 1994 and 1982 respectfully. Ganahl failed to appeal to the large unaffiliated bloc of state voters along with political moderates. During her campaign, she highlighted her opposition to abortion (at odds with most Colorado voters), utilized incendiary right-wing rhetoric in regards to several social and cultural issues, and courted figures involved with pushing conspiracy theories about elections.

Prior to the election, an article by Daniel Strain from the University of Colorado reported that 71% of Colorado voters said their state's elections will be conducted "fairly and accurately", while 54% said the same for other elections across the United States. 53% of voters also disapproved of the Supreme Court's decision in Dobbs v. Jackson Women's Health Organization to overturn Roe v. Wade. 63% of voters said Joe Biden won the 2020 election, although Biden had a 52% disapproval among Centennial State voters compared to 39% who approved of him.

Despite Biden's low approval, a Marist poll conducted in October found that amongst 1,221 Colorado adults, Governor Polis had a 50% approval, while Ganahl suffered from low name recognition, with 42% having either never heard of her or were unsure how to rate her. The same poll also found that 34% of voters were most concerned about inflation, followed by preserving democracy at 29%, abortion at 16%, crime at 7%, followed by healthcare and immigration at 6% each.

Notes

Partisan clients

References

External links 
Official campaign websites
 Heidi Ganahl (R) for Governor
 Danielle Neuschwanger (C) for Governor
 Jared Polis (D) for Governor
 Kevin Ruskusky (L) for Governor

Gubernatorial
2022
2022 United States gubernatorial elections